Maxwell Lord IV is a supervillain appearing in American comic books published by DC Comics. The character first appeared in Justice League #1 (May 1987) and was created by Keith Giffen, J. M. DeMatteis, and Kevin Maguire. Maxwell Lord was originally introduced as a shrewd and powerful businessman who was an ally of the Justice League and was influential in the formation of the Justice League International, but he later developed into an adversary of Wonder Woman and the Justice League.

The character made his cinematic debut in the 2020 DC Extended Universe film, Wonder Woman 1984, portrayed by Pedro Pascal.

Fictional character biography 
Maxwell Lord IV is the son of Maxwell Lord III, a successful businessman and head of the Chimtech Consortium. Maxwell III set out to be a good example for his son by striving to always do what was right. When Maxwell IV was 16, he came home to find his father dead in an apparent suicide. His father had discovered that his company had produced a highly carcinogenic product, and could not bear the guilt.

Lord's mother was convinced by her husband to employ a similar practice, cajoling heroic metahumans to help Lord. Thus, he sparked the plans to bring the Justice League, leaderless and broken after the Crisis on Infinite Earths event, under his exclusive control.

Giffen and DeMatteis years 
Lord initially works behind the scenes to establish the Justice League, while under the control of a computer created by the villainous Metron. The computer wanted Lord to set up a worldwide peacekeeping organization as part of its plan to dominate the world.

A later retcon changed his controller to the villainous computer program Kilg%re (pronounced Kilgore), which had taken over Metron's machine. A much later retcon mitigated the Kilg%re's and Metron's influence, stating that Lord already had plans for taking over the League, and that he would have pursued them regardless.

Lord's ruthlessness at this time is illustrated when he sets up a disturbed would-be terrorist as a villain for the League to defeat, resulting in the man's death. Later, Lord rebels against the computer's influence and destroys it.

Once free of the computer's influence, Lord is portrayed as an amoral businessman, but not a real villain. During the time that Giffen and DeMatteis were writing the Justice League, Lord is shown struggling with his conscience and developing heroic qualities, though he would remain a con-artist.

From Invasion! to Identity Crisis 
Originally a normal human, Lord is one of many people on Earth gifted with superpowers during the Invasion crossover, when a Gene Bomb is exploded by alien invaders. This bomb activates Lord's latent metagene, granting him the ability to control the minds of others, albeit at great difficulty. Despite being a metahuman, Lord never identifies as one. Instead, at the urging of his mother to act for the benefit of non-metahumans, he shifts his hatred for the generic "authority figures" who caused his father's death to the metahuman community.

After he is shot and placed in a coma at the beginning of JLAmerica/JLEurope crossover Breakdowns, Supervillain Dreamslayer takes over Lord's body and supercharges Lord's power, allowing him to control thousands of minds at once. Using Lord's body and power, Dreamslayer almost forces the Justice League International (JLI) to disband. While possessed Lord forces the JLI to battle itself, the mortally wounded Silver Sorceress manages to contain Dreamslayer, and holds him within her mind as she dies, taking him with her. When Lord is freed, his power is burnt out.

Later, Lord is diagnosed with a brain tumor and dies. Kilg%re however, had been waiting for the right moment to reactivate its control of Lord. Kilg%re downloads Lord's consciousness into a duplicate of one of Dreamslayer's allies, Extremist cyborg Lord Havok (in a further retcon the body is said to be a New Genesis-built automaton). In this form, he spends some time testing the League's capabilities and takes control of the secret organization the Arcana. The cyborg body later shifts to resemble his original human form.

Doomsday later crash lands on Earth, easily trounces the League and kills Superman. With Earth undefended, world-conqueror Mongul invades and destroys Coast City killing Lord's mother. This event further fuels his hatred and paranoia against the metahumans, as well as leading him to believe that not only can metahumans not be trusted, but that their personal battles and scuffles are enough to shatter world safety.

Lord puts together several former JLI members, including L-Ron, Captain Atom, Blue Beetle, Booster Gold, and Fire as the "Super Buddies", advertised as "heroes the common man could call". These stories are told in the six-issue miniseries Formerly Known as the Justice League in 2003, and its 2005 sequel, I Can't Believe It's Not the Justice League.

In Brad Meltzer's Identity Crisis (2004), Lord attends Sue Dibny's funeral and speaks to Booster Gold, further denting his already dwindling faith in superheroes.

Infinite Crisis 

The 2005 80-page one-shot Countdown to Infinite Crisis reveals that Lord is no longer a cyborg, and is apparently a criminal mastermind who spent years running the JLI while gathering sensitive information about the world's superheroes, whom he considered a threat to the planet. Simultaneously, he sabotaged JLI efforts to render the superhero team as ineffectual as possible. At the end of the prologue special issue, he shoots and kills one-time JLI member, Ted Kord, the second Blue Beetle, when the hero discovers Lord's secret and refuses to join Lord.

During this time, Alexander Luthor Jr., the god-like son of Lex Luthor from an alternate Earth, gives Lord control over Batman's Brother Eye, a satellite system Batman created to monitor all superhuman contact. Lord uses Brother Eye to create an army of OMACs (humans infected with a nano-virus that transformed them into cyborgs), programmed to hunt down and kill all superhumans.

Lord also uses his powers to influence Superman's mind, causing him to brutally beat Batman in the belief that he is Brainiac. Lord subsequently sends Superman to attack Wonder Woman after making him believe that she is his old enemy Doomsday who has just killed his wife Lois Lane. Lord justifies the resulting destruction as proof of his argument about the dangers of superhumans, pointing out the devastation that Wonder Woman and Superman could cause if they fought in a crowded area, and arguing that the fact that Superman can be brought under another's control is evidence that superhumans cannot be relied upon. In the midst of her battle with Superman, Diana realizes that even if she defeats him, he would still remain under Lord's absolute mental control. She creates a diversion lasting long enough for her to race back to Lord's location and asks that he release Superman. Lord, bound by her lasso of truth, complies but states that he'll use Superman again to kill people. When she demands to know how to free Superman from Lord's control, Lord replies "Kill me." Wonder Woman then snaps his neck. Brother Eye broadcasts the footage of Wonder Woman killing Lord all over the world, destroying her reputation and her friendship with Batman and Superman, who reject her despite the fact that she saved their lives. As the crisis unfolds, the three eventually reconcile as Diana helps Superman talk down his other self and prevents Batman from shooting Alexander Luthor Jr., accepting that Diana did what she had to do and acknowledging that, for all their differences, they all still want justice.

At the "Crisis Counseling" panel at Wizard World Chicago, Dan DiDio explained DC's reasoning in using Lord's character in Infinite Crisis. After going through several possible characters who could be the "new leader for the offshoot of Checkmate", Maxwell Lord was suggested. Many of the editors thought that the idea made sense, as Lord had been shown to have a mean streak and to have killed previously. The idea was dropped due to the continuity errors, such as him being a cyborg, but they went back to it later after deciding none of the other possible characters were suitable. Didio explained: "We thought about that aspect of the story [where Maxwell was turned into a cyborg] some more. And then asked, 'Did anyone read it?' No. 'Did anyone like the idea?' No. So we moved ahead with Max as being a human, and having been a human, and not letting that small part of the past stand in the way of this story. We wanted what was best for Countdown [to Infinite Crisis], and for us, that meant that Max had to be a human".

One Year Later 

Lord reappeared in 2007 in the first two-story arcs of the new Booster Gold series by Geoff Johns and Dan Jurgens. At the end of the 52 Pick-Up story arc, Booster Gold and Blue Beetles from the past, present and future go back in time to Countdown to Infinite Crisis and prevent Lord from killing Ted Kord. In the subsequent Blue and Gold story arc, Blue Beetle and Booster Gold discover that, in saving Ted Kord, they have created a new timeline where Lord was never killed by Wonder Woman and Lord's OMACs, and that a mind-controlled Superman has turned the entire planet into a police state. Lord reveals that he had been returned to human form after dozens of clandestine operations and that he learned the importance of control during that time. When Booster Gold and Blue Beetle, having assembled their old JLI teammates, storm Brother Eye, Lord is killed by Dr. Light when she blasts a hole through his chest. Ted Kord realizes that his death is the only way to fix the timestream and leaves the battle, seemingly to return to the past and accept his death.

Lord next makes an appearance in the Trinity maxi-series (2008-9). Lord's skull is stolen by a group called the Dreambound and brought to Morgaine Le Fey for usage in a spell, which requires an item connected to Wonder Woman.

Blackest Night 

During the Blackest Night (2009–10) storyline, Maxwell Lord is identified as one of the deceased people entombed below the Hall of Justice. Lord's corpse is revived as a Black Lantern during the event. Targeting Wonder Woman, he lures her to Arlington National Cemetery with a trail of slaughtered bodies. When Wonder Woman arrives, he springs a trap, using black rings to revive the bodies of fallen soldiers. Wonder Woman uses her lasso to reduce Lord and the soldiers to dust, but as she leaves, the dust begins to regenerate. Some time later, Lord resumes his attack on Wonder Woman, who had recently been deputized as a Star Sapphire. Wonder Woman encases Lord's body in a violet crystal, then shatters it to pieces. Lord continues to taunt her, speaking out of a piece of crystal. He is later brought back to life by the power of the White Light. Though Guy Gardner attempts to restrain him, Lord uses his mind control abilities to make Guy let him leave.

Brightest Day 
Lord is among the other resurrected heroes/villains featured in the Brightest Day (2010) series. He is first seen attempting to push his mind control powers further than ever, but severely injures himself in the attempt, despite his meticulous preparations, which include a constant blood supply and an ice pool. Later, Deadman's white power ring gives him a vision where Lord is shown shaking hands with Jaime Reyes, the third Blue Beetle. However, in this vision, Lord is hiding a gun behind his back, implying that Lord is planning to kill Reyes, just as Lord killed Reyes' predecessor, Ted Kord.

In the first issue of Justice League: Generation Lost, Lord is the subject of an unprecedented international manhunt. He is found hiding in the old Justice League International embassy by Booster Gold, whom Lord is able to defeat. Lord then uses a device to amplify his mind control powers to unprecedented levels. With these, he erases the world's memory of his existence. Initially, it appears that only his former Justice League colleagues Booster Gold, Ice, Fire, and Captain Atom remember Max. It is later revealed in Brightest Day #8 that Deadman also remembers his existence. Lord uses his powers to disgrace the team, having Fire ousted from Checkmate, Captain Atom turned in as a fugitive for betraying the U.S. Army, and Ice isolated from Guy Gardner, who Lord causes to believe that she tried to kill him. He also influences the superhero community into believing Ted Kord committed suicide, which enrages Booster Gold. He then sends OMACs after the current Blue Beetle, Jaime Reyes, who calls Booster Gold and the others for help. Meanwhile, Lord discovers that his resurrection has come with a side effect: some of his efforts to control others' minds transform his targets into cadavers wearing Black Lantern uniforms. Contacting his former colleagues through a fallen Rocket Red's armor, Lord reveals that he intentionally exempted them from the worldwide mindwipe, and that he wants them to protect the world as they did in the old days. He then warns the group not to come looking for him, unaware that Blue Beetle had located his transmission signal.

Captain Atom tells the others that an explosion, seen in Brightest Day #1, propelled him briefly into the 24th century, where he saw a world reduced to a pre-industrial state by a metahuman war instigated by Lord. The team resolves to try to prevent Lord from bringing about this dystopia. Maxwell Lord is at one point contacted by the Entity, who tells him to stop Magog from plunging the world into war. Lord then sees a vision of himself, with Magog's staff, killing a distraught Magog, who begs for mercy. The Entity gives Lord a vision of a possible future where Magog's team attacks Parasite. In this vision, Parasite's absorption of Captain Atom causes an explosion that destroys everything within a large radius and annihilates over a million people (similar to the Kingdom Come future). Also, Power Girl witnesses her new enemy C.R.A.S.H. confronting Lord before heading towards the teleporter.

When the team next encounters Lord, after mind-controlling first Fire and then Booster Gold to prevent them from stopping him, he teleports from the old JLI embassy back to Checkmate, where he attempts to enlist Magog to kill Captain Atom. Lord uses technology to upgrade Magog's staff into emitting energy blasts. Meanwhile, Lord asks Professor Ivo to reprogram the Metal Men. He then asks Doctor Sivana to create a genetically engineered humanoid clone of Power Girl.

When Captain Atom and Magog battle in the heart of Chicago, Captain Atom is able to convince Magog that he's being used, and Magog remembers Lord. Lord uses his powers to force Magog to kill himself. He then makes everyone believe that they watched Captain Atom murder Magog. The Entity proclaims that Lord has completed his task, and his life is restored to him. After briefly receiving a White Ring, the recently returned Bruce Wayne seems to be aware of Max Lord's resurrection. When Captain Atom absorbs the energy from Magog's spear, he is propelled forward through time to 112 years in the future, where Lord, while long dead, has plunged humanity into a massive metahuman war ruled by OMACs. Captain Atom is eventually returned to the present, but not before a dying Power Girl tells him that the catalyst for all this was Wonder Woman's death by Lord's hand. Also, Batman (Damian Wayne) tells him how to stop Lord's ultimate plans. However, Lord is struck with the discovery that, with the exception of the original four ex-JLI members, no one in the world remembers Wonder Woman.

Later, when the Creature Commandos attack the JLI embassy, Lord poses as a member. He captures Jaime Reyes, and heads towards the teleporter with him, while the others are unable to stop him. Lord regains his abilities to transform his targets into cadaver OMACs, and he tortures the captive Blue Beetle. Lord's mindwipes feed off psychic energy, so the more people who are around, the faster some of them will forget. In issue #19, the rest of the team locates Lord's secret facility in a submersible below the Sea of Japan. Seconds before the team reaches him, and as predicted by the White Ring, Lord shoots Jaime in the head (echoing his execution of Jaime's predecessor, Ted Kord). The JLI arrives and attacks Lord, but he escapes from the JLI in one of his headquarters' escape pods, and the headquarters vanishes.

While the JLI learns Jaime is alive, the team also learns that Lord not only manipulated them, but also wanted the JLI to chase him to distract Checkmate. Later, Lord uses a device to enhance his mental powers, turning people around the world into OMACs to attack Wonder Woman and the JLI. Before the device activates, Lord sends the OMAC Prime that he controls to attack the heroes. Booster Gold manages to locate Lord's flying headquarters, attacking it to confront him face-to-face. Lord gains the upper hand with his mental powers, but Captain Atom grabs him, after having become overloaded with quantum energy in the fight with OMAC Prime and about to be pulled into the timestream. Atom threatens to take Lord with him unless Lord undoes the global mindwipe, and a desperate Lord complies. Captain Atom is pulled away and Lord teleports to escape from the heroes. Later, he posts an online video where he blames Professor Ivo for Magog's rampage. He also says that he only wants to protect the world from the metahuman threat, and he will continue to do so in secret.

The New 52 
In September 2011, The New 52 rebooted DC's continuity. Max Lord still runs Checkmate as the Black King, but now has leadership seniority over Cadmus and its programs. He successfully captures Batman's superpower monitoring satellite, Brother Eye, for his own purposes, but it ends up creating an agent with which it would act through seeking vengeance. Lord ends up getting into heated battle with an all new OMAC who was formerly one of the project's employees.

DC Rebirth 
Still the running head of Checkmate during DC Rebirth, Lord assembles a team consisting of Doctor Polaris, Emerald Empress, Johnny Sorrow, Rustam of Prime Earth, and Lobo to assist him in his efforts to take down Amanda Waller. He chose these five as they were the 'original' incarnation of the Suicide Squad, and hence have experience working as a team, prompting Waller to capture the Justice League to ask for their help against Lord. While most of the heroes and villains do not recognize Lord, the displaced pre-Flashpoint Superman shows awareness of him, reflecting on his past contact with Lord before reality was reset.

Although the combined forces of the League and the Squad are able to defeat Lord's allies, they are unable to prevent Lord from achieving his goal; with the aid of a controlled Killer Frost, Lord acquires the Heart of Darkness from a vault, using it to enhance his powers to "infect" (take control of) the League. Lord uses the infected Justice League (apart from Batman, who Lord did not infect) to achieve "peace" across America, and has Waller kidnapped and taken before him. However, despite believing that he had taken precautions to control the Heart, Lord is forced by Waller to recognize that it is manipulating his perceptions, using Lord's powers to spread chaos and evil across the world, and twisting Lord's perception of what is transpiring. When Waller is able to bring him to his senses, Lord tries to remove the Heart of Darkness, but it consumes him and transforms him into Eclipso. Eclipso is driven out of Lord when Killer Frost is able to use her powers to create a prism of ice, channeling Superman's heat vision at just the right frequency to disrupt Lord's hold on his slaves, with Lord subsequently being immobilized by Killer Frost. Lord awakens in a cell specially designed to hold him, with injectors pumping so much blood thinner into him that he would bleed to death if he attempted to access his powers. He mockingly asks Waller if she set this whole thing up just to 'justify' the Squad to the League, but Waller declines to reply, and simply informs him that he is to prepare himself for service on "Task Force XI".

Lord later works under the supervision of Wonder Woman to stop his dangerous technology from threatening innocent people.

Powers and abilities 
In his original depictions, Maxwell Lord had no abilities, but later became a metahuman as a result of the Dominators' invasion of Earth. Lord's powers allow him to telepathically influence people's minds, typically in the form of pushing a subconscious suggestion to others. Using his power causes Max's nose to bleed, and requires great mental strain. Over time, Lord's powers grew to the point where he could take full control of other beings, even Superman, although it required a great deal of time and patience for him to establish the necessary level of control over the Man of Steel. His powers made him such a threat to global security that Wonder Woman was forced to kill him after questioning him under the Lasso of Truth confirmed that his death was the only way to free Superman.

When the character was resurrected, following Blackest Night, in the story Justice League: Generation Lost, he prepared to erase the world's memories of his past criminal actions; to survive the trauma to his brain, he placed his body in a large tub of ice and hooked himself up to a blood transfusion machine. The life entity somehow changed his abilities and would initially convert living people into the corpses of a Black Lantern. With his task completed, Lord was now fully restored, he then exhibited voluntary activation and control over every resting O.M.A.C. infected within the global populace.

Following a company-wide reboot, Lord was reintroduced as part of the DC Rebirth publishing event, now having been a metahuman since his youth. His primary power is tweaked to a form of powerful psychic persuasion which works best when paired with a vocal command. In this later depiction, his powers work by exploiting and promoting people's underlying desires and inhibitions to make them do his bidding. His power does not give him outright control over them, as he can only push them to act on their own subconscious wants. For example, he could draw out Deadshot's subconscious desire to kill his daughter so that he could be free to kill anyone, but when he used his power on Killer Frost, he only drew out her desire to make a difference.

Other versions

Earth One
In Wonder Woman: Earth One, Maxwell Lord is an expert entrepreneur who provides his services to the US Army in areas such as robotics, tactical analysis and psychology. He was the main expert against alleged plans of an Amazon invasion and domination of the men of the world by women. He is also the mind behind the Project A.R.E.S.
It is subsequently revealed that he is actually the modern disguise of Ares.

Amalgam Comics
In the Amalgam Comics universe, Lord is mixed with Cameron Hodge to form Lord Maxwell Hodge.

Elseworlds
In the Elseworlds tale Justice Riders, Lord is reimagined as a villainous 19th Century railroad baron who employs Felix Faust.

In other media

Television
 Maxwell Lord appears in the Justice League Unlimited episode "Ultimatum", voiced by Tim Matheson. This version is a member of Project Cadmus and the human manager of the Ultimen, a team of genetically-engineered superheroes who operate independently of the Justice League.
 Maxwell Lord appears in the ninth season of Smallville, portrayed by Gil Bellows. Introduced in the episode "Charade", this version is the Black King of Checkmate who possesses the ability to extract memories from others, which he uses in an attempt to determine "The Blur's" identity. While he is thwarted by Clark Kent, Lord escapes, only to be apprehended by Checkmate's mysterious Red Queen. In the episode "Hostage", Lord kidnaps and interrogates Tess Mercer in a mental illusion to try to find the Book of Rao. However, she intentionally gives him incorrect information that eventually allows her to escape so she can move the book. Following this, Lord is incapacitated by the Red Queen for his failure.
 Maxwell Lord appears in the first season of Supergirl, portrayed by Peter Facinelli. This version is the founder of Lord Technologies and the son of scientists who were killed due to unsafe conditions, making him distrustful of all government agencies, who possesses a god complex. Seeking to expose Supergirl's identity, he uses her DNA to turn a comatose girl into a Bizarro version of her to frame and kill the real one. However, Supergirl and Alex Danvers defeat the clone while Lord is arrested by the Department of Extranormal Operations (DEO), though they release him in return for his help in freeing Supergirl from the Black Mercy's effects. Following this, he creates a synthetic form of Kryptonite to cure Supergirl after she is exposed to Red Kryptonite he had created to stop Non's impending invasion before secretly giving General Lane some of it.
 Maxwell Lord appears in the DC Super Hero Girls episode "#WorldsFinest", voiced by P. J. Byrne. This version is a public relations specialist.

Film
 Maxwell Lord was meant to appear in Justice League: Mortal, portrayed by Jay Baruchel. This version, named Jonah Wilkes, who was abducted as a child and given psychic abilities by the US government as part of the OMAC Project.
 Maxwell "Max" Lord appears in Wonder Woman 1984, portrayed by Pedro Pascal as an adult, Lambro Demetriou as a child, and John Barry as a teenager. This version, whose real name is Maxwell Lorenzano, grew up poor, was abused by his father, picked on by bullies, and bootstrapped himself on the idea of image and publicized promises. By 1984, he became an aspiring businessman, the owner of the company Black Gold, and father to a son named Alistair (portrayed by Lucian Perez). While seeking out the Dreamstone, an artifact created by the Duke of Deception that grants users one wish while extracting a heavy toll unless they renounce their wish or destroy the stone, he manipulates Barbara Ann Minerva into helping him acquire it and grants himself the stone's powers to save his failing company and grant others' wishes in exchange for whatever he desires. Over time, he rapidly rises to power and becomes an influential figure while unknowingly causing international chaos and self-inflicted mental and physical distress. After learning of and utilizing a satellite system to grant wishes around the world and restore his health, he is confronted by Wonder Woman, who eventually convinces him to renounce his original wish. Following this, Lord comes to terms with his flaws and reunites with Alistair, promising to be a better father to him.

References 

Characters created by J. M. DeMatteis
Characters created by Keith Giffen
Comics characters introduced in 1987
DC Comics martial artists
DC Comics metahumans
DC Comics supervillains
DC Comics male supervillains
DC Comics telepaths
Fictional businesspeople
DC Comics cyborgs
Superman characters
Wonder Woman characters